The Chusovoy constituency (No.59) is a Russian legislative constituency in Perm Krai. Until 2007 the constituency was more compact, covering half of Perm and several rural districts to the north of the city. However, after 2015 redistricting the constituency gave several parts of Perm to Kungur constituency, while gaining districts in eastern Perm Krai.

Members elected

Election results

1993

|-
! colspan=2 style="background-color:#E9E9E9;text-align:left;vertical-align:top;" |Candidate
! style="background-color:#E9E9E9;text-align:left;vertical-align:top;" |Party
! style="background-color:#E9E9E9;text-align:right;" |Votes
! style="background-color:#E9E9E9;text-align:right;" |%
|-
|style="background-color:#0085BE"|
|align=left|Viktor Pokhmelkin
|align=left|Choice of Russia
|
|37.49%
|-
|style="background-color:"|
|align=left|Vladimir Zotin
|align=left|Independent
| -
|11.30%
|-
| colspan="5" style="background-color:#E9E9E9;"|
|- style="font-weight:bold"
| colspan="3" style="text-align:left;" | Total
| 
| 100%
|-
| colspan="5" style="background-color:#E9E9E9;"|
|- style="font-weight:bold"
| colspan="4" |Source:
|
|}

1995

|-
! colspan=2 style="background-color:#E9E9E9;text-align:left;vertical-align:top;" |Candidate
! style="background-color:#E9E9E9;text-align:left;vertical-align:top;" |Party
! style="background-color:#E9E9E9;text-align:right;" |Votes
! style="background-color:#E9E9E9;text-align:right;" |%
|-
|style="background-color:#3A46CE"|
|align=left|Viktor Pokhmelkin (incumbent)
|align=left|Democratic Choice of Russia – United Democrats
|
|25.21%
|-
|style="background-color:"|
|align=left|Nail Salakhov
|align=left|Independent
|
|16.57%
|-
|style="background-color:"|
|align=left|Vladimir Zotin
|align=left|Yabloko
|
|9.85%
|-
|style="background-color:#2C299A"|
|align=left|Aleksandr Reshetnikov
|align=left|Congress of Russian Communities
|
|8.06%
|-
|style="background-color:#E98282"|
|align=left|Irina Novikova
|align=left|Women of Russia
|
|6.59%
|-
|style="background-color:#D50000"|
|align=left|Aleksandr Smirnov
|align=left|Communists and Working Russia - for the Soviet Union
|
|5.44%
|-
|style="background-color:"|
|align=left|Stanislav Parkhomenko
|align=left|Liberal Democratic Party
|
|4.60%
|-
|style="background-color:"|
|align=left|Yelena Bacheva
|align=left|Independent
|
|3.53%
|-
|style="background-color:#CE1100"|
|align=left|Valentin Markovsky
|align=left|My Fatherland
|
|3.38%
|-
|style="background-color:#1C1A0D"|
|align=left|Aleksey Chernykh
|align=left|Forward, Russia!
|
|3.04%
|-
|style="background-color:"|
|align=left|Sergey Russkikh
|align=left|Independent
|
|1.41%
|-
|style="background-color:"|
|align=left|Vladimir Noskov
|align=left|Independent
|
|0.83%
|-
|style="background-color:"|
|align=left|Gennady Musalimov
|align=left|Independent
|
|0.35%
|-
|style="background-color:"|
|align=left|Nikolay Pozdeyev
|align=left|Independent
|
|0.29%
|-
|style="background-color:#000000"|
|colspan=2 |against all
|
|8.58%
|-
| colspan="5" style="background-color:#E9E9E9;"|
|- style="font-weight:bold"
| colspan="3" style="text-align:left;" | Total
| 
| 100%
|-
| colspan="5" style="background-color:#E9E9E9;"|
|- style="font-weight:bold"
| colspan="4" |Source:
|
|}

1999

|-
! colspan=2 style="background-color:#E9E9E9;text-align:left;vertical-align:top;" |Candidate
! style="background-color:#E9E9E9;text-align:left;vertical-align:top;" |Party
! style="background-color:#E9E9E9;text-align:right;" |Votes
! style="background-color:#E9E9E9;text-align:right;" |%
|-
|style="background-color:#1042A5"|
|align=left|Viktor Pokhmelkin (incumbent)
|align=left|Union of Right Forces
|
|22.40%
|-
|style="background-color:"|
|align=left|Sergey Levitan
|align=left|Independent
|
|18.27%
|-
|style="background-color:"|
|align=left|Lyubov Zotina
|align=left|Yabloko
|
|8.58%
|-
|style="background-color:"|
|align=left|Ivan Yurov
|align=left|Communist Party
|
|8.47%
|-
|style="background-color:"|
|align=left|Nina Anikina
|align=left|Independent
|
|7.98%
|-
|style="background-color:"|
|align=left|Vitaly Zelenkin
|align=left|Independent
|
|5.60%
|-
|style="background-color:"|
|align=left|Vladimir Durbazhev
|align=left|Independent
|
|4.35%
|-
|style="background-color:"|
|align=left|Aleksandr Belorusov
|align=left|Independent
|
|3.28%
|-
|style="background-color:"|
|align=left|Igor Korolev
|align=left|Independent
|
|2.21%
|-
|style="background-color:"|
|align=left|Vladimir Ilyinykh
|align=left|Independent
|
|2.16%
|-
|style="background-color:"|
|align=left|Andrey Mishkin
|align=left|Liberal Democratic Party
|
|1.46%
|-
|style="background-color:#000000"|
|colspan=2 |against all
|
|12.70%
|-
| colspan="5" style="background-color:#E9E9E9;"|
|- style="font-weight:bold"
| colspan="3" style="text-align:left;" | Total
| 
| 100%
|-
| colspan="5" style="background-color:#E9E9E9;"|
|- style="font-weight:bold"
| colspan="4" |Source:
|
|}

2003

|-
! colspan=2 style="background-color:#E9E9E9;text-align:left;vertical-align:top;" |Candidate
! style="background-color:#E9E9E9;text-align:left;vertical-align:top;" |Party
! style="background-color:#E9E9E9;text-align:right;" |Votes
! style="background-color:#E9E9E9;text-align:right;" |%
|-
|style="background-color:#004090"|
|align=left|Viktor Pokhmelkin (incumbent)
|align=left|New Course — Automobile Russia
|
|22.34%
|-
|style="background-color:#1042A5"|
|align=left|Aleksey Chernov
|align=left|Union of Right Forces
|
|16.97%
|-
|style="background-color:#FFD700"|
|align=left|Oleg Borovik
|align=left|People's Party
|
|9.49%
|-
|style="background-color:"|
|align=left|Anastasia Maltseva
|align=left|Independent
|
|7.33%
|-
|style="background-color:"|
|align=left|Mikhail Kasimov
|align=left|Yabloko
|
|7.23%
|-
|style="background-color:"|
|align=left|Sergey Levitan
|align=left|Independent
|
|7.01%
|-
|style="background-color:"|
|align=left|Anatoly Kholoimov
|align=left|Liberal Democratic Party
|
|2.65%
|-
|style="background-color:"|
|align=left|Dmitry Chumachenko
|align=left|Independent
|
|2.38%
|-
|style="background-color:"|
|align=left|Konstantin Lezhnev
|align=left|Independent
|
|0.93%
|-
|style="background-color:"|
|align=left|Stanislav Otmakhov
|align=left|Independent
|
|0.49%
|-
|style="background-color:#000000"|
|colspan=2 |against all
|
|20.24%
|-
| colspan="5" style="background-color:#E9E9E9;"|
|- style="font-weight:bold"
| colspan="3" style="text-align:left;" | Total
| 
| 100%
|-
| colspan="5" style="background-color:#E9E9E9;"|
|- style="font-weight:bold"
| colspan="4" |Source:
|
|}

2016

|-
! colspan=2 style="background-color:#E9E9E9;text-align:left;vertical-align:top;" |Candidate
! style="background-color:#E9E9E9;text-align:left;vertical-align:top;" |Party
! style="background-color:#E9E9E9;text-align:right;" |Votes
! style="background-color:#E9E9E9;text-align:right;" |%
|-
|style="background-color: " |
|align=left|Aleksey Burnashov
|align=left|United Russia
|
|45.50%
|-
|style="background-color:"|
|align=left|Irina Volynets
|align=left|A Just Russia
|
|10.98%
|-
|style="background-color:"|
|align=left|Yevgeny Sivtsev
|align=left|Liberal Democratic Party
|
|10.08%
|-
|style="background-color:"|
|align=left|Gennady Storozhev
|align=left|Communist Party
|
|8.61%
|-
|style="background:"| 
|align=left|Yury Pimkin
|align=left|Communists of Russia
|
|5.91%
|-
|style="background-color: " |
|align=left|Irina Sadilova
|align=left|Yabloko
|
|5.40%
|-
|style="background:"| 
|align=left|Raisa Simonova
|align=left|People's Freedom Party
|
|1.93%
|-
|style="background-color:"|
|align=left|Stepan Podaruyev
|align=left|Rodina
|
|1.49%
|-
|style="background-color:"|
|align=left|Aleksey Ruban
|align=left|Patriots of Russia
|
|1.48%
|-
| colspan="5" style="background-color:#E9E9E9;"|
|- style="font-weight:bold"
| colspan="3" style="text-align:left;" | Total
| 
| 100%
|-
| colspan="5" style="background-color:#E9E9E9;"|
|- style="font-weight:bold"
| colspan="4" |Source:
|
|}

2021

|-
! colspan=2 style="background-color:#E9E9E9;text-align:left;vertical-align:top;" |Candidate
! style="background-color:#E9E9E9;text-align:left;vertical-align:top;" |Party
! style="background-color:#E9E9E9;text-align:right;" |Votes
! style="background-color:#E9E9E9;text-align:right;" |%
|-
|style="background-color: " |
|align=left|Roman Vodyanov
|align=left|United Russia
|
|30.51%
|-
|style="background-color:"|
|align=left|Marina Zimina
|align=left|Communist Party
|
|17.89%
|-
|style="background-color:"|
|align=left|Irina Zlobina
|align=left|A Just Russia — For Truth
|
|14.69%
|-
|style="background-color:"|
|align=left|Oleg Postnikov
|align=left|Liberal Democratic Party
|
|11.40%
|-
|style="background-color: " |
|align=left|Aleksey Ivchansky
|align=left|New People
|
|8.24%
|-
|style="background:"| 
|align=left|Aleksey Mikhaylov
|align=left|Communists of Russia
|
|5.93%
|-
|style="background:"| 
|align=left|Svetlana Ivanova
|align=left|Yabloko
|
|2.86%
|-
| colspan="5" style="background-color:#E9E9E9;"|
|- style="font-weight:bold"
| colspan="3" style="text-align:left;" | Total
| 
| 100%
|-
| colspan="5" style="background-color:#E9E9E9;"|
|- style="font-weight:bold"
| colspan="4" |Source:
|
|}

Notes

References

Russian legislative constituencies
Politics of Perm Krai